The 2009–10 Boston Celtics season was the 64th season of the franchise in the National Basketball Association (NBA). The Celtics finished with a record of 50–32, a 12 win drop off from the previous season. They finished 1st in the Atlantic Division and 4th in the Eastern Conference.

In the playoffs, the Celtics defeated the Miami Heat in five games in the First Round, then defeated the top-seeded Cleveland Cavaliers (in a rematch of the 2008 Conference Semifinals) again in six games in the Semifinals, and finally, defeated the second-seeded Orlando Magic (the runner-up of last year's Finals as well as the team that defeated the Celtics in last season's Conference Semifinals in seven games) in six games in the Conference Finals to advance to the NBA Finals for the twenty-first time in franchise history.

The Celtics made it back to the NBA Finals after a one-year hiatus and played against the defending NBA champion and their rival, the Los Angeles Lakers for the 12th time. In a rematch of the 2008 NBA Finals, in which the Celtics defeated the Lakers in six games to capture their seventeenth championship, the Celtics were defeated this time by the Lakers in seven games.

The Celtics would not reach the Finals again until 2022 where they faced Golden State Warriors in a rematch of the 1964 NBA Finals and lost in six games.

Key dates 
 June 25 – The 2009 NBA draft took place in New York City.
 July 8 – The free agency period started.
 October 27 – The regular season started with a 95–89 win over the Cleveland Cavaliers.
 March 24 – The Celtics clinched a spot in the Playoffs with a 113–99 win over the Denver Nuggets.
 March 26 – The Celtics clinched the Atlantic Division title with a 94–86 win over the Sacramento Kings.
 April 17 – The Celtics won Game 1 in their first-round playoff series against the Miami Heat (85–76).
 April 27 – The Celtics won their series against the Miami Heat 4–1 and advanced to the Eastern Conference semi-finals after a 96–86 win in Game 5.
 May 13 – The Celtics advanced to the Eastern Conference finals after they won their series 4–2 against the Cleveland Cavaliers following a 94–85 win in Game 6.
 May 28 – The Celtics advanced to the NBA Finals after they defeated the Orlando Magic 96–84 in Game 6 to win the series 4–2.
 June 17 – The Celtics lost to the Los Angeles Lakers 83–79 in Game 7 of the NBA Finals and failed to capture their 18th NBA Championship.

Summary

NBA Draft 2009

Free agency

Draft picks

Roster

Pre-season 

|- align="center" bgcolor="#ffbbbb"
| 1 || October 7 || @ Houston Rockets || 90–96 || || || || 6,300(Hidalgo, Texas) || 0–1 recap
|- align="center" bgcolor="#ccffcc"
| 2 || October 9 || New York Knicks || 82–96 || || || || 18,624 || 1–1 recap
|- align="center" bgcolor="#ccffcc"
| 3 || October 11 || Brooklyn Nets || 93–100 || || || || 18,624 || 2–1 recap
|- align="center" bgcolor="#ccffcc"
| 4 || October 13 || @Brooklyn Nets || 91–88 || || || || 12,790(Newark, New Jersey) || 3–1 recap
|- align="center" bgcolor="#ccffcc"
| 5 || October 14 || Toronto Raptors || 90–106 || || || || 10,117(Hartford, Connecticut) || 4–1 recap
|- align="center" bgcolor="#ccffcc"
| 6 || October 18 || @Toronto Raptors || 101–82 || || || || 13,607 || 5–1 recap
|- align="center" bgcolor="#ffbbbb"
| 7 || October 20 || @New York Knicks || 103–108 || || || || 18,792 || 5–2 recap
|- align="center" bgcolor="#ccffcc"
| 8 || October 21 || @Cleveland Cavaliers || 96–82 || || || || 18,021(Columbus, Ohio) || 6–2 recap
|-

Regular season

Standings

Record vs. opponents

Game log 

|- bgcolor="#bbffbb"
| 1
| October 27
| @ Cleveland
| 
| Paul Pierce (23)
| Paul Pierce (11)
| Rajon Rondo (10)
| Quicken Loans Arena20,562
| 1–0
|- bgcolor="#bbffbb"
| 2
| October 28
| New Orleans
| 
| Ray Allen (18)
| Shelden Williams (9)
| Rajon Rondo (11)
| TD Garden18,624
| 2–0
|- bgcolor="#bbffbb"
| 3
| October 30
| Chicago
| 
| Paul Pierce (22)
| Shelden Williams (10)
| Rajon Rondo (16)
| TD Garden18,624
| 3–0

|- bgcolor="#bbffbb"
| 4
| November 1
| New Orleans
| 
| Paul Pierce (27)
| Kevin Garnett, Kendrick Perkins (7)
| Rajon Rondo (10)
| TD Garden 18,624
| 4–0
|- bgcolor="#bbffbb"
| 5
| November 3
| @ Philadelphia
| 
| Paul Pierce (21)
| Paul Pierce (8)
| Rajon Rondo (5)
| Wachovia Center 11,251
| 5–0
|- bgcolor="#bbffbb"
| 6
| November 4
| @ Minnesota
| 
| Rajon Rondo (18)
| Kevin Garnett (11)
| Rajon Rondo (6)
| Target Center 19,133
| 6–0
|- bgcolor="#ffcccc"
| 7
| November 6
| Phoenix
| 
| Kevin Garnett (26)
| Kevin Garnett (8)
| Rajon Rondo (11)
| TD Garden 18,624
| 6–1
|- bgcolor="#bbffbb"
| 8
| November 7
| @ New Jersey
| 
| Paul Pierce, Rajon Rondo (16)
| Kevin Garnett (13)
| Paul Pierce (7)
| Izod Center 16,119
| 7–1
|- bgcolor="#bbffbb"
| 9
| November 11
| Utah
| 
| Kevin Garnett (18)
| Kendrick Perkins (8)
| Rajon Rondo (11)
| TD Garden 18,624
| 8–1
|- bgcolor="#ffcccc"
| 10
| November 13
| Atlanta
| 
| Paul Pierce (24)
| Kendrick Perkins (9)
| Rajon Rondo (9)
| TD Garden18,624
| 8–2
|- bgcolor="#ffcccc"
| 11
| November 14
| @ Indiana
| 
| Ray Allen (24)
| Kendrick Perkins (13)
| Paul Pierce, Rajon Rondo, Ray Allen (4)
| Conseco Fieldhouse18,165
| 8–3
|- bgcolor="#bbffbb"
| 12
| November 18
| Golden State
| 
| Paul Pierce (19)
| Kendrick Perkins, Rajon Rondo (7)
| Rajon Rondo (12)
| TD Garden18,624
| 9–3
|- bgcolor="#ffcccc"
| 13
| November 20
| Orlando
| 
| Paul Pierce (21)
| Rasheed Wallace (13)
| Ray Allen, Rajon Rondo (6)
| TD Garden18,624
| 9–4
|- bgcolor="#bbffbb"
| 14
| November 22
| @ New York
| 
| Paul Pierce (33)
| Kendrick Perkins (13)
| Rajon Rondo (10)
| Madison Square Garden19,763
| 10–4
|- bgcolor="#bbffbb"
| 15
| November 25
| Philadelphia
| 
| Paul Pierce (27)
| Kendrick Perkins (8)
| Rajon Rondo (7)
| TD Garden18,624
| 11–4
|- bgcolor="#bbffbb"
| 16
| November 27
| Toronto
| 
| Ray Allen (20)
| Kevin Garnett (7)
| Rajon Rondo (11)
| TD Garden18,624
| 12–4
|- bgcolor="#bbffbb"
| 17
| November 29
| @ Miami
| 
| Kevin Garnett (24)
| Kendrick Perkins (13)
| Rajon Rondo (11)
| American Airlines Arena18,104
| 13–4

|- bgcolor="#bbffbb"
| 18
| December 1
| @ New Orleans
| 
| Ray Allen (27)
| Kendrick Perkins (12)
| Rajon Rondo (9)
| Time Warner Cable Arena15,129
| 14–4
|- bgcolor="#bbffbb"
| 19
| December 3
| @ San Antonio
| 
| Kevin Garnett (20)
| Kevin Garnett, Kendrick Perkins (7)
| Rajon Rondo (12)
| AT&T Center18,581
| 15–4
|- bgcolor="#bbffbb"
| 20
| December 4
| @ Oklahoma City
| 
| Kevin Garnett (23)
| Kevin Garnett, Kendrick Perkins (8)
| Rajon Rondo (6)
| Ford Center18,203
| 16–4
|- bgcolor="#bbffbb"
| 21
| December 8
| Milwaukee
| 
| Kevin Garnett (25)
| Kevin Garnett, Rajon Rondo (9)
| Rajon Rondo (13)
| TD Garden18,624
| 17–4
|- bgcolor="#bbffbb"
| 22
| December 10
| @ Washington
| 
| Rajon Rondo (21)
| Kendrick Perkins (11)
| Rajon Rondo (11)
| Verizon Center20,173
| 18–4
|- bgcolor="#bbffbb"
| 23
| December 12
| @ Chicago
| 
| Rajon Rondo (16)
| Kevin Garnett (10)
| Rajon Rondo (14)
| United Center21,257
| 19–4
|- bgcolor="#bbffbb"
| 24
| December 14
| @ Memphis
| 
| Paul Pierce (19)
| Kevin Garnett (8)
| Rajon Rondo (9)
| FedExForum14,193
| 20–4
|- bgcolor="#ffcccc"
| 25
| December 18
| Philadelphia
| 
| Kevin Garnett (21)
| Kendrick Perkins (16)
| Rajon Rondo (10)
| TD Garden 18,624
| 20–5
|- bgcolor="#bbffbb"
| 26
| December 20
| Minnesota
| 
| Paul Pierce (29)
| Kendrick Perkins (11)
| Rajon Rondo (15)
| TD Garden 18624
| 21–5
|- bgcolor="#bbffbb"
| 27
| December 22
| Indiana
| 
| Ray Allen (23)
| Rasheed Wallace (13)
| Rajon Rondo (9)
| TD Garden18,624
| 22–5
|- bgcolor="#bbffbb"
| 28
| December 25
| @ Orlando
| 
| Ray Allen (18)
| Rajon Rondo (13)
| Rajon Rondo (8)
| Amway Arena17,461
| 23–5
|- bgcolor="#ffcccc"
| 29
| December 27
| @ L.A. Clippers
| 
| Rajon Rondo (20)
| Tony Allen (10)
| Rajon Rondo (6)
| Staples Center19,060
| 23–6
|- bgcolor="#ffcccc"
| 30
| December 28
| @ Golden State
| 
| Rajon Rondo (30)
| Kendrick Perkins (14)
| Rajon Rondo (15)
| Oracle Arena19,259
| 23–7
|- bgcolor="#ffcccc"
| 31
| December 30
| @ Phoenix
| 
| Eddie House (19)
| Kendrick Perkins, Tony Allen (7)
| Rajon Rondo (8)
| US Airways Arena18,422
| 23–8

|- bgcolor="#bbffbb"
| 32
| January 2
| Toronto
| 
| Ray Allen (23)
| Kendrick Perkins (10)
| Tony Allen (7)
| TD Garden18,624
| 24–8
|- bgcolor="#bbffbb"
| 33
| January 6
| @ Miami
| 
| Rajon Rondo (25)
| Kendrick Perkins (10)
| Rajon Rondo (8)
| American Airlines Arena19,600
| 25–8
|- bgcolor="#ffcccc"
| 34
| January 8
| @ Atlanta
| 
| Paul Pierce (21)
| Kendrick Perkins (14)
| Rajon Rondo (10)
| Philips Arena15,149
| 25–9
|- bgcolor="#bbffbb"
| 35
| January 10
| @ Toronto
| 
| Rasheed Wallace (29)
| Rajon Rondo (10)
| Rajon Rondo (13)
| Air Canada Centre19,800
| 26–9
|- bgcolor="#ffcccc"
| 36
| January 11
| Atlanta
| 
| Rajon Rondo (26)
| Kendrick Perkins (9)
| Rajon Rondo (7)
| TD Garden18,624
| 26–10
|- bgcolor="#bbffbb"
| 37
| January 13
| @ New Jersey
| 
| Paul Pierce (24)
| Kendrick Perkins (8)
| Rajon Rondo (14)
| Izod Center14,112
| 27–10
|- bgcolor="#ffcccc"
| 38
| January 14
| Chicago
| 
| Paul Pierce (20)
| Kendrick Perkins (10)
| Rajon Rondo (7)
| TD Garden18,624
| 27–11
|- bgcolor="#ffcccc"
| 39
| January 18
| Dallas
| 
| Paul Pierce (24)
| Kendrick Perkins (12)
| Rajon Rondo (12)
| TD Garden18,624
| 27–12
|- bgcolor="#ffcccc"
| 40
| January 20
| @ Detroit
| 
| Paul Pierce, Rajon Rondo (21)
| Rajon Rondo (8)
| Rajon Rondo (7)
| The Palace of Auburn Hills17,375
| 27–13
|- bgcolor="#bbffbb"
| 41
| January 22
| Portland
| 
| Paul Pierce (24)
| Kendrick Perkins (11)
| Rajon Rondo (9)
| TD Garden18,624
| 28–13
|- bgcolor="#bbffbb"
| 42
| January 25
| L.A. Clippers
| 
| Paul Pierce (22)
| Kendrick Perkins (15)
| Rajon Rondo (12)
| TD Garden18,624
| 29–13
|- bgcolor="#ffcccc"
| 43
| January 28
| @ Orlando
| 
| Ray Allen (20)
| Kevin Garnett, Rajon Rondo (7)
| Rajon Rondo (8)
| Amway Arena17,461
| 29–14
|- bgcolor="#ffcccc"
| 44
| January 29
| @ Atlanta
| 
| Paul Pierce (35)
| Kendrick Perkins (12)
| Rajon Rondo (8)
| Philips Arena18,732
| 29–15
|- bgcolor="#ffcccc"
| 45
| January 31
| L.A. Lakers
| 
| Rajon Rondo (21)
| Kendrick Perkins (10)
| Rajon Rondo (12)
| TD Garden18,624
| 29–16

|- bgcolor="#bbffbb"
| 46
| February 1
| @ Washington
| 
| Kevin Garnett (19)
| Paul Pierce (8)
| Rajon Rondo (12)
| Verizon Center20,173
| 30–16
|- bgcolor="#bbffbb"
| 47
| February 3
| Miami
| 
| Ray Allen (23)
| Ray Allen (7)
| Rajon Rondo (14)
| TD Garden18,624
| 31–16
|- bgcolor="#bbffbb"
| 48
| February 5
| New Jersey
| 
| Ray Allen (26)
| Ray Allen, Kevin Garnett (7)
| Rajon Rondo (11)
| TD Garden18,624
| 32–16
|- bgcolor="#ffcccc"
| 49
| February 7
| Orlando
| 
| Rajon Rondo (17)
| Kevin Garnett (9)
| Rajon Rondo (9)
| TD Garden18,624
| 32–17
|- bgcolor="#ffcccc"
| 50
| February 10
| @ New Orleans
| 
| Paul Pierce (15)
| Kevin Garnett, Kendrick Perkins (7)
| Paul Pierce, Rajon Rondo (4)
| New Orleans Arena14,848
| 32–18
|- align="center"
| colspan="9" style="background:#bbcaff;" | All-Star Break
|- bgcolor="#bbffbb"
| 51
| February 16
| @ Sacramento
| 
| Paul Pierce, Rasheed Wallace (17)
| Kevin Garnett (9)
| Rajon Rondo (6)
| ARCO Arena14,439
| 33–18
|- bgcolor="#bbffbb"
| 52
| February 18
| @ L.A. Lakers
| 
| Ray Allen (24)
| Kendrick Perkins (14)
| Rajon Rondo (11)
| Staples Center18,997
| 34–18
|- bgcolor="#bbffbb"
| 53
| February 19
| @ Portland
| 
| Ray Allen (21)
| Kendrick Perkins (9)
| Rajon Rondo (11)
| Rose Garden20,618
| 35–18
|- bgcolor="#ffcccc"
| 54
| February 21
| @ Denver
| 
| Ray Allen (25)
| Glen Davis (7)
| Rajon Rondo (11)
| Pepsi Center19,818
| 35–19
|- bgcolor="#bbffbb"
| 55
| February 23
| New York
| 
| Ray Allen (24)
| Kevin Garnett (8)
| Rajon Rondo (16)
| TD Garden18,624
| 36–19
|- bgcolor="#ffcccc"
| 56
| February 25
| Cleveland
| 
| Ray Allen (21)
| Kevin Garnett (10)
| Rajon Rondo (11)
| TD Garden18,624
| 36–20
|- bgcolor="#ffcccc"
| 57
| February 27
| New Jersey
| 
| Kevin Garnett (26)
| Kevin Garnett (9)
| Rajon Rondo (17)
| TD Garden18,624
| 36–21

|- bgcolor="#bbffbb"
| 58
| March 2
| @ Detroit
| 
| Ray Allen (18)
| Kevin Garnett (9)
| Rajon Rondo (11)
| The Palace of Auburn Hills17,956
| 37–21
|- bgcolor="#bbffbb"
| 59
| March 3
| New Orleans
| 
| Paul Pierce (27)
| Marquis Daniels, Kevin Garnett (5)
| Rajon Rondo (6)
| TD Garden18,624
| 38–21
|- bgcolor="#bbffbb"
| 60
| March 5
| @ Philadelphia
| 
| Kevin Garnett (22)
| Kevin Garnett (8)
| Rajon Rondo (11)
| Wachovia Center19,008
| 39–21
|- bgcolor="#bbffbb"
| 61
| March 7
| Washington
| 
| Ray Allen (25)
| Kevin Garnett (10)
| Rajon Rondo (7)
| TD Garden18,624
| 40–21
|- bgcolor="#ffcccc"
| 62
| March 9
| @ Milwaukee
| 
| Rajon Rondo (20)
| Kevin Garnett (10)
| Rajon Rondo (6)
| Bradley Center14,316
| 40–22
|- bgcolor="#ffcccc"
| 63
| March 10
| Memphis
| 
| Ray Allen, Rajon Rondo (17)
| Kevin Garnett (7)
| Rajon Rondo (8)
| TD Garden18,624
| 40–23
|- bgcolor="#bbffbb"
| 64
| March 12
| Indiana
| 
| Paul Pierce (20)
| Kendrick Perkins (7)
| Rajon Rondo (11)
| TD Garden18,624
| 41–23
|- bgcolor="#ffcccc"
| 65
| March 14
| @ Cleveland
| 
| Ray Allen (20)
| Rajon Rondo (8)
| Rajon Rondo (6)
| Quicken Loans Arena20,562
| 41–24
|- bgcolor="#bbffbb"
| 66
| March 15
| Detroit
| 
| Ray Allen, Michael Finley, Paul Pierce (15)
| Kevin Garnett, Kendrick Perkins (8)
| Rajon Rondo (6)
| TD Garden18,624
| 42–24
|- bgcolor="#bbffbb"
| 67
| March 17
| New York
| 
| Paul Pierce (29)
| Kendrick Perkins (12)
| Rajon Rondo (12)
| TD Garden18,624
| 43–24
|- bgcolor="#bbffbb"
| 68
| March 19
| @ Houston
| 
| Paul Pierce (26)
| Rasheed Wallace (9)
| Rajon Rondo (10)
| Toyota Center18,198
| 44–24
|- bgcolor="#bbffbb"
| 69
| March 20
| @ Dallas
| 
| Paul Pierce (29)
| Rajon Rondo (10)
| Paul Pierce, Rajon Rondo (5)
| American Airlines Center20,488
| 45–24
|- bgcolor="#ffcccc"
| 70
| March 22
| @ Utah
| 
| Ray Allen (16)
| Kendrick Perkins (8)
| Rajon Rondo (6)
| EnergySolutions Arena19,911
| 45–25
|- bgcolor="#bbffbb"
| 71
| March 24
| Denver
| 
| Paul Pierce (27)
| Rajon Rondo (11)
| Rajon Rondo (15)
| TD Garden18,624
| 46–25
|- bgcolor="#bbffbb"
| 72
| March 26
| Sacramento
| 
| Paul Pierce (22)
| Kevin Garnett (13)
| Rajon Rondo (18)
| TD Garden18,624
| 47–25
|- bgcolor="#ffcccc"
| 73
| March 28
| San Antonio
| 
| Paul Pierce (18)
| Kevin Garnett (10)
| Rajon Rondo (7)
| TD Garden18,624
| 47–26
|- bgcolor="#ffcccc"
| 74
| March 31
| Oklahoma City
| 
| Kevin Garnett, Rasheed Wallace (18)
| Kevin Garnett (9)
| Rajon Rondo (11)
| TD Garden18,624
| 47–27

|- bgcolor="#ffcccc"
| 75
| April 2
| Houston
| 
| Paul Pierce (27)
| Rasheed Wallace (8)
| Rajon Rondo (10)
| TD Garden18,624
| 47–28
|- bgcolor="#bbffbb"
| 76
| April 4
| Cleveland
| 
| Ray Allen (33)
| Kendrick Perkins (10)
| Rajon Rondo (14)
| TD Garden18,624
| 48–28
|- bgcolor="#ffcccc"
| 77
| April 6
| @ New York
| 
| Ray Allen (17)
| Kendrick Perkins (8)
| Rajon Rondo (6)
| Madison Square Garden19,763
| 48–29
|- bgcolor="#bbffbb"
| 78
| April 7
| @ Toronto
| 
| Rajon Rondo (21)
| Kendrick Perkins (9)
| Rajon Rondo (7)
| Air Canada Centre18,793
| 49–29
|- bgcolor="#ffcccc"
| 79
| April 9
| Washington
| 
| Rajon Rondo (17)
| Paul Pierce (7)
| Rajon Rondo (12)
| TD Garden18,624
| 49–30
|- bgcolor="#bbffbb"
| 80
| April 10
| @ Milwaukee
| 
| Paul Pierce (24)
| Glen Davis, Rasheed Wallace (7)
| Rajon Rondo (10)
| Bradley Center18,717
| 50–30
|- bgcolor="#ffcccc"
| 81
| April 13
| @ Chicago
| 
| Paul Pierce (28)
| Kendrick Perkins (11)
| Rajon Rondo (6)
| United Center20,649
| 50–31
|- bgcolor="#ffcccc"
| 82
| April 14
| Milwaukee
| 
| Rajon Rondo (21)
| Rajon Rondo, Rasheed Wallace (6)
| Rajon Rondo (15)
| TD Garden18,624
| 50–32
|-

Playoffs

Game log 

|- bgcolor="#ccffcc"
| 1
| April 17
| Miami
| 
| Paul Pierce (16)
| Kevin Garnett (9)
| Rajon Rondo (10)
| TD Garden18,624
| 1–0
|- bgcolor="#ccffcc"
| 2
| April 20
| Miami
| 
| Ray Allen (25)
| Kendrick Perkins (10)
| Rajon Rondo (12)
| TD Garden18,624
| 2–0
|- bgcolor="#ccffcc"
| 3
| April 23
| @ Miami
| 
| Paul Pierce (32)
| Kendrick Perkins (12)
| Rajon Rondo (8)
| American Airlines Arena19,500
| 3–0
|- bgcolor="#ffcccc"
| 4
| April 26
| @ Miami
| 
| Rajon Rondo (23)
| Kevin Garnett (12)
| Rajon Rondo (9)
| American Airlines Arena19,520
| 3–1
|- bgcolor="#ccffcc"
| 5
| April 27
| Miami
| 
| Ray Allen (24)
| Kevin Garnett, Rajon Rondo (8)
| Rajon Rondo (12)
| TD Garden18,624
| 4–1

|- bgcolor="#ffcccc"
| 1
| May 1
| @ Cleveland
| 
| Rajon Rondo (27)
| Kendrick Perkins (11)
| Rajon Rondo (12)
| Quicken Loans Arena20,562
| 0–1
|- bgcolor="#ccffcc"
| 2
| May 3
| @ Cleveland
| 
| Ray Allen (22)
| Kevin Garnett (10)
| Rajon Rondo (19)
| Quicken Loans Arena20,562
| 1–1
|- bgcolor="#ffcccc"
| 3
| May 7
| Cleveland
| 
| Kevin Garnett (19)
| Rajon Rondo (5)
| Rajon Rondo (8)
| TD Garden18,624
| 1–2
|- bgcolor="#ccffcc"
| 4
| May 9
| Cleveland
| 
| Rajon Rondo (29)
| Rajon Rondo (18)
| Rajon Rondo (13)
| TD Garden18,624
| 2–2
|- bgcolor="#ccffcc"
| 5
| May 11
| @ Cleveland
| 
| Ray Allen (25)
| Paul Pierce (11)
| Paul Pierce, Rajon Rondo (7)
| Quicken Loans Arena20,562
| 3–2
|- bgcolor="#ccffcc"
| 6
| May 13
| Cleveland
| 
| Kevin Garnett (22)
| Kevin Garnett (12)
| Rajon Rondo (12)
| TD Garden18,624
| 4–2

|- bgcolor="#ccffcc"
| 1
| May 16
| @ Orlando
| 
| Ray Allen (25)
| Kevin Garnett (11)
| Rajon Rondo (8)
| Amway Arena17,461
| 1–0
|- bgcolor="#ccffcc"
| 2
| May 18
| @ Orlando
| 
| Paul Pierce (28)
| Kevin Garnett (9)
| Rajon Rondo (8)
| Amway Arena17,461
| 2–0
|- bgcolor="#ccffcc"
| 3
| May 22
| Orlando
| 
| Glen Davis (17)
| Paul Pierce (9)
| Rajon Rondo (12)
| TD Garden18,624
| 3–0
|- bgcolor="#ffcccc"
| 4
| May 24
| Orlando
| 
| Paul Pierce (32)
| Kevin Garnett (12)
| Rajon Rondo (8)
| TD Garden18,624
| 3–1
|- bgcolor="#ffcccc"
| 5
| May 26
| @ Orlando
| 
| Rasheed Wallace (21)
| Kevin Garnett (5)
| Ray Allen (7)
| Amway Arena17,461
| 3–2
|- bgcolor="#ccffcc"
| 6
| May 28
| Orlando
| 
| Paul Pierce (31)
| Paul Pierce (13)
| Rajon Rondo (6)
| TD Garden18,624
| 4–2

|- bgcolor="#ffcccc"
| 1
| June 3
| @ L.A. Lakers
| 
| Paul Pierce (24)
| Paul Pierce (9)
| Rajon Rondo (8)
| Staples Center18,997
| 0–1
|- bgcolor="#ccffcc"
| 2
| June 6
| @ L.A. Lakers
| 
| Ray Allen (32)
| Rajon Rondo (12)
| Rajon Rondo (10)
| Staples Center18,997
| 1–1
|- bgcolor="#ffcccc"
| 3
| June 8
| L.A. Lakers
| 
| Kevin Garnett (25)
| Kendrick Perkins (11)
| Rajon Rondo (8)
| TD Garden18,624
| 1–2
|- bgcolor="#ccffcc"
| 4
| June 10
| L.A. Lakers
| 
| Paul Pierce (19)
| Kendrick Perkins (7)
| Paul Pierce (5)
| TD Garden18,624
| 2–2
|- bgcolor="#ccffcc"
| 5
| June 13
| L.A. Lakers
| 
| Paul Pierce (27)
| Kevin Garnett (10)
| Rajon Rondo (8)
| TD Garden18,624
| 3–2
|- bgcolor="#ffcccc"
| 6
| June 15
| @ L.A. Lakers
| 
| Ray Allen (19)
| Glen Davis (9)
| Rajon Rondo (6)
| Staples Center18,997
| 3–3
|- bgcolor="#ffcccc"
| 7
| June 17
| @ L.A. Lakers
| 
| Paul Pierce (18)
| Paul Pierce (10)
| Rajon Rondo (10)
| Staples Center18,997
| 3–4
|-

Player statistics

Season 

1Stats with the Celtics.

Playoffs

Awards, records and milestones

Awards

Week/Month 
 On December 7, 2009 Kevin Garnett was named Eastern Conference's Player of the Week (November 30 – December 6).
 On March 22, 2010 Paul Pierce was named Eastern Conference's Player of the Week (March 15–21).

All-Star 

 Kevin Garnett was voted to his 11th consecutive (13th overall) All-Star Game as a starter.
 Paul Pierce was selected to his 8th All-Star Game.
 Rajon Rondo was selected to play in the All-Star Game for the first time in his career.
 Paul Pierce won the Three-Point Contest.

Season 
 Rajon Rondo was named to the NBA All-Defensive First Team.

Records 
 Rajon Rondo set two new single-season franchise records. On March 26, he grabbed his 168th steal of the season and broke Rick Fox's record of 167 steals in a season with the Boston Celtics. On April 2, he dished out his 716th assist of the season, thus breaking Bob Cousy's franchise record of 715 assists made in a season. Rondo dished out 794 assists and stole the ball 189 times in the 2009–10 season.

Milestones 
 On October 27, 2009 game against the Cleveland Cavaliers Kevin Garnett passed Hall of Famer Moses Malone for 21st place on the NBA's career blocking list, having blocked 1,736 shots.
 On October 28, 2009 game against the New Orleans Hornets Paul Pierce passed Dan Majerle for 17th place on the NBA's career 3-pointer list with 1,363 3-pointers.
 On October 30, 2009 game against the Chicago Bulls Ray Allen passed Hall of Famer John Stockton for 33rd place on the NBA's career scoring list, having scored 19,715 points.
 On November 13, 2009 game against the Atlanta Hawks Paul Pierce passed Hall of Famer Bob McAdoo for 49th place on the NBA's career scoring list, having scored 18,790 points.
 On November 18, 2009 game against the Golden State Warriors Paul Pierce passed Hall of Famer Isiah Thomas for 48th place on the NBA's career scoring list, having scored 18,824 points.
 On November 20, 2009 game against the Orlando Magic Paul Pierce passed Chet Walker for 47th place on the NBA's career scoring list, having scored 18,845 points.
 On November 25, 2009 game against the Philadelphia 76ers Paul Pierce passed Antoine Walker for 16th place on the NBA's career 3-pointer list with 1,389 3-pointers.
 On December 1, 2009 game against the Charlotte Bobcats Paul Pierce passed Scottie Pippen for 46th place on the NBA's career scoring list, having scored 18,946 points.
 On December 3, 2009 game against the San Antonio Spurs Rasheed Wallace passed Clifford R. Robinson for 34th place on the NBA's career blocking list, having blocked 1,391 shots.
 On December 8, 2009 game against the Milwaukee Bucks Kevin Garnett passed Hall of Famer Hal Greer for 25th place on the NBA's career scoring list, having scored 21,601 points, and Micheal Ray Richardson for 36th place on career steal list with 1,465 steals.
 On December 10, 2009 game against the Washington Wizards Paul Pierce passed Brent Barry for 15th place on the NBA's career 3-pointer list with 1,397 3-pointers.
 On December 12, 2009 game against the Chicago Bulls Paul Pierce passed Dale Ellis and Reggie Theus for 44th place on the NBA's career scoring list, having scored 19,016 points.
 On December 18, 2009 game against the Philadelphia 76ers Kevin Garnett passed Artis Gilmore for 20th place on the NBA's career blocking list, having blocked 1,751 shots.
 On December 20, 2009 game against the Minnesota Timberwolves Ray Allen passed Tom Chambers for 32nd place on the NBA's career scoring list, having scored 20,059 points.
 On December 28, 2009 game against the Golden State Warriors Kevin Garnett passed Kevin Willis for 21st place on the NBA's career rebounding list with 11,903 rebounds.
 On January 8, 2010 game against the Atlanta Hawks Rasheed Wallace passed Mark West for 33rd place on the NBA's career blocking list, having blocked 1,404 shots.
 On January 13, 2010 game against the Brooklyn Nets Paul Pierce passed Hall of Famer Gail Goodrich for 43rd place on the NBA's career scoring list, having scored 19,191 points.
 On January 14, 2010 game against the Chicago Bulls Paul Pierce passed Eddie Johnson for 42nd place on the NBA's career scoring list, having scored 19,211 points.
 On January 25, 2010 game against the Los Angeles Clippers Paul Pierce passed Hall of Famer Bob Lanier for 41st place on the NBA's career scoring list, having scored 19,257 points.
 On February 1, 2010 game against the Washington Wizards Kevin Garnett passed Hall of Famer Larry Bird for 24th place on the NBA's career scoring list, having scored 21,792 points and Dennis Johnson for 35th place on the steals list with 1,478 steals.
 On February 5, 2010 game against the Brooklyn Nets Kevin Garnett passed Gary Payton for 23rd place on the NBA's career scoring list, having scored 21,816 points.
 On February 7, 2010 game against the Orlando Magic Kevin Garnett passed Dennis Rodman for 20th place on the NBA's career rebounding list with 11,960 rebounds.
 On February 7, 2010 game against the Orlando Magic Paul Pierce passed T. R. Dunn for 50th place on the NBA's career steals list with 1,318 steals.
 On February 21, 2010 game against the Denver Nuggets Kevin Garnett passed Hall of Famer Elvin Hayes for 19th place on the NBA's career blocking list, having blocked 20,521 points.
 On February 21, 2010 game against the Denver Nuggets Ray Allen passed Mitch Richmond for 31st place on the NBA's career scoring list, having scored 20,510 points.
 On February 23, 2010 game against the New York Knicks Kevin Garnett became the 20th player in NBA history to reach 12,000 rebounds in his career.
 On March 3, 2010 game against the Charlotte Bobcats Paul Pierce passed Terry Cummings for 40th place on the NBA's career scoring list, having scored 19,482 points.
 On March 10, 2010 game against the Memphis Grizzlies Paul Pierce passed Walter Davis for 39th place on the NBA's career scoring list, having scored 19,532 points.
 On March 15, 2010 game against the Detroit Pistons Ray Allen passed Hall of Famer George Gervin for 31st place on the NBA's career scoring list, having scored 20,510 points (Dirk Nowitzki has passed Ray Allen since February 21).
 On March 17, 2010 game against the New York Knicks Paul Pierce passed Clifford Robinson for 38th place on the NBA's career scoring list, having scored 19,614 points.

Injuries and surgeries 
 Kendrick Perkins tore two ligaments in his right knee in Game 6 of the NBA Finals and missed the rest of the playoffs

Transactions

References

External links 
 2009–10 Boston Celtics season Official Site
 2009–10 Boston Celtics season at ESPN
 2009–10 Boston Celtics season at Basketball Reference

Boston Celtics seasons
Eastern Conference (NBA) championship seasons
Boston Celtics
Boston Celtics
Boston Celtics
Celtics
Celtics